Juan Román Pucheta (born 11 July 2002) is an Argentine professional footballer who plays as a centre-forward for Brown de Adrogué, on loan from Argentinos Juniors.

Career
Pucheta came through the youth ranks of Argentinos Juniors, eventually signing his first professional contract in June 2020; penning terms until 31 December 2024. He made the breakthrough into first-team football at the age of eighteen, initially featuring in pre-season friendlies against the likes of Talleres and Atlanta. His senior debut arrived on 31 October 2020, after the centre-forward was substituted on with seven minutes remaining of a goalless draw at home to San Lorenzo in the Copa de la Liga Profesional. In that competition, Pucheta scored his first goal on 30 November in a 4–1 win away against Aldosivi.

In July 2021, Pucheta joined Tristán Suárez on a loan deal for the rest of the year. In January 2022, he was sent out on a new loan, this time to San Martín SJ, for one year. However, the spell was cut short half through, at it was exchanged with a loan spell at Brown de Adrogué instead, until the end of 2023, which was confirmed in June 2022.

Career statistics
.

Notes

References

External links

2002 births
Living people
Sportspeople from Buenos Aires Province
Argentine footballers
Association football forwards
Argentinos Juniors footballers
CSyD Tristán Suárez footballers
San Martín de San Juan footballers
Club Atlético Brown footballers